Angels is a 2007 Filipino trilogy film directed by Gina Alajar and starring Angel Locsin, Jennylyn Mercado, Patrick Garcia, and Marvin Agustin.

Plot
Angels is a trilogy. The three episodes featured in the films are: "Angel of Mine", "Daddy's Angel" and "Angel of Love". "Angel of Mine," directed by Gina Alajar, features a career woman forced to attend a child left by this problematic mother. "Daddy's Angel" follows the bitter father-and-son relationship between a (dying) ex-convict and this affectionate young boy who bore miserable stigmas of a brutal past. A young man is imprisoned for killing a close friend, who raped his wife on his wedding day. While in prison, his wife gets pregnant, giving birth to this angelic boy. The wife dies before his sentence is due. In "Angel of Love", Bianang, a frustrated musician, is caught in a tangle of family concerns. Orphaned by their mother and abandoned by their father. She is left to look after her two younger siblings and fend for their needs by finding her niche in the music industry. By some twist of fate, guised through Kerubina, her path crosses with Jude, a guy from a matriarchal clan of aristocrats who battles with repercussions of ending a heavily laden relationship.

Cast

Episode One: Angel of Mine
Angel Locsin as Angie
Eunice Lagusad as Gelay
Pinky Amador as Ditas
Malou de Guzman as Senyang
Ketchup Eusebio as Cacho
Malou Crisologo as Lefty

Episode Two: Daddy's Angel
Marvin Agustin as Ruben
Valerie Concepcion as Lennie
Nash Aguas as Angelo
Jaclyn Jose as Celia
Dominic Ochoa as Egay
Paolo Paraiso as Anton

Episode Three: Angels of Love
Jennylyn Mercado as Bianang
Patrick Garcia as Jude
Ella Cruz as Kerubina
Nico Antonio as Barkada
Boots Anson-Roa as Conching
Allan Paule as Nanding
Empress Schuck as Nina
Marco Alcaraz as Acid
Karel Marquez as Tracy
Ian Veneracion as Paul
Roman Solito as Ben

References

External links
Angel Locsin Website

2007 films
2000s Tagalog-language films
2000s English-language films
2007 multilingual films
Philippine multilingual films
Films directed by Mark A. Reyes
Dingdong Dantes films